Events from the year 1597 in the Kingdom of Scotland.

Incumbents
Monarch – James VI

Events
 4 February – Battle of Logiebride, a skirmish between men of the Clan Mackenzie against those of the Clan Munro and the Bain family of Tulloch Castle.
March–October – The Great Scottish Witch Hunt of 1597.
 14 July – poet Alexander Montgomerie is declared an outlaw after the collapse of a Catholic plot.
 23 July – Earthquake in the Highlands.
Lands of the Clan MacLeod are forfeit to the Crown.
Scottish Poor Laws make parishes rather than the church responsible for the administration of poor relief.
King James VI's Daemonologie is published.

Births
Robert Bethune, Baron of Balfour
Sir Duncan Campbell of Auchinbreck, soldier (murdered 1645)
Approximate date –
Lady Mary Erskine, Countess Marischal
Andrew Murray, 1st Lord Balvaird, minister (died 1644)

Deaths
 11 March – Henry Drummond, evangelical writer and lecturer
 27 May – James Tyrie, Jesuit theologian (born 1543)
Sir Thomas Maclellan of Bombie, Provost of Kirkcudbright

See also
 Timeline of Scottish history

References